Mirikitani is a Japanese surname. It may refer to:
 The Cats of Mirikitani, a 2006 documentary film
 Jimmy Mirikitani, a New York artist
 Janice Mirikitani, poet laureate of San Francisco